Gene George Abdallah (June 16, 1936 – November 2, 2019) was an American politician. He served in the South Dakota House of Representatives from 2001 to 2002 as well as 2011 to 2012 and in the Senate from 2002 to 2010.

Abdallah served in the South Dakota Air National Guard from 1954 to 1962. He served in the Minnehaha County Sheriff's Department and was the chief deputy sheriff. Abdallah worked for the SoDak Distributors in Sioux Falls. He also was the superintendent of the South Dakota Highway Patrol and a United States marshal. He died in Sioux Falls in 2019, aged 83.

References

1936 births
2019 deaths
Republican Party members of the South Dakota House of Representatives
Politicians from Sioux Falls, South Dakota
Republican Party South Dakota state senators
United States Marshals
Businesspeople from South Dakota
South Dakota National Guard personnel
20th-century American businesspeople